Laeko, or Laeko-Libuat (pronounced Limbuat), is a Torricelli language of Papua New Guinea.

It is spoken in Leiko and Libuat villages of Leiko ward, Maimai Wanwan Rural LLG, Nuku District, Sandaun Province.

References

Maimai languages
Languages of Sandaun Province